The Fiora is a river in northern Lazio and southern Tuscany, central Italy, which springs from the southern flank of the Monte Amiata, near Santa Fiora. After crossing the Lazio Maremma, it flows in the north-western part of the province of Viterbo before getting into the Tyrrhenian Sea near Montalto di Castro. One of the remarkable settlements in the Fiora River during the Bronze Age period is Crostoletto di Lamone, a plateau.

External links
 Vulci Castle and Fiora River

Rivers of Lazio
Rivers of the Province of Grosseto
Rivers of the Province of Viterbo
Drainage basins of the Tyrrhenian Sea
Rivers of Italy